Reisholz is an urban quarter of Düsseldorf, part of Borough 9. It is located in the south of the city, bordering Holthausen, Benrath, Hassels and the river Rhine.

Reisholz is an industrial part of the city. Its history started in 1905 by creation of a harbour to the Rhine, a goods station and an industrial area by the Industrie-Terrains Düsseldorf-Reisholz (IDR) company. Many chemical factories, engine building industries, paper mills, petrochemical manufacturers and an oil refinery went to Reisholz. 
In 1907 the IDR company built a neogothic church. It was demolished, when the Henkel Company expanded in Reisholz, but Henkel built a new church for Reisholz.
Reisholz belonged to Benrath and became a part of Düsseldorf together with Benrath in 1929.

In the harbour of Reisholz there are plans for a new business and living area.

References

Urban districts and boroughs of Düsseldorf